Virginia Emerson Hopkins (born May 6, 1952) is an inactive Senior United States district judge of the United States District Court for the Northern District of Alabama.

Early life and education
Born in Anniston, Alabama, Hopkins graduated from University of Alabama with her Bachelor of Arts degree in 1974 and later from University of Virginia School of Law with a Juris Doctor in 1977.

Legal career
Following law school graduation, Hopkins was in private practice in Birmingham, Alabama, from 1977 to 1978. She was in private practice in Washington, D.C. from 1978 to 1991. She was in private practice in Anniston, Alabama from 1991 to 2004.

Federal judicial career
On the recommendation of Senators Richard Shelby and Jeff Sessions, Hopkins was nominated to the United States District Court for the Northern District of Alabama by President George W. Bush on October 14, 2003, to a seat vacated due to the death of Edwin L. Nelson. Hopkins was confirmed by the Senate on June 15, 2004, and received her commission on June 17, 2004. She assumed senior status on June 22, 2018. She took inactive senior status on September 1, 2019.

Sources

References

1952 births
Living people
American women lawyers
American lawyers
Judges of the United States District Court for the Northern District of Alabama
United States district court judges appointed by George W. Bush
21st-century American judges
University of Alabama alumni
University of Virginia School of Law alumni
People from Anniston, Alabama
21st-century American women judges